The Thaalibia Quran is a mushaf (Quranic manuscript) written in Algeria in the Maghrebi script.

Manuscript description 
The transcription of this mushaf was done in accordance with the Warsh recitation, which is the main canonical qirāʼah, or method of reciting the Qur'an, practiced in North Africa.

Since 1895, the two brothers Kaddour Rodosi and Ali Rodosi made this initiative to publish a Warsh mushaf through their  publishing house, Thaalibia Publishing.

Editions 
The printed copy of this Quran Mus'haf followed several editions.

The 1905 edition Mus'haf was first published by the Thaalibia Publishing in 1905 in a full version. The manuscript was written by Ahmed Mansali.

The 1907 edition was edited by the same publisher. The manuscript of this edition of the Mus'haf was written by Omar Racim (1884–1959).

The manuscript of 1912 edition was written by Mohamed Cherradi, who was also responsible for the 1931 edition. and 1937 edition.

The 1937 Mus'haf  was also divided in four quarters printed separately:
 First quarter, from Al-Fatiha to Al-An'am.
 Second quarter, from Al-A'raf to Al-Kahf.
 Third quarter, from Maryam to Fatir.
 Fourth quarter, from Ya-Sin to Al-Nas.

The Thaalibia Quran was reproduced by independent Algeria from 1962 til 1971 in a full version.

The idea of realizing the Algeria Quran was then born and concretised in 1979 with the participation of the illustrator .

Gallery

1931 edition

1937 edition

See also 

 Islam in Algeria
 Algeria Quran
 Ten recitations
 Warsh recitation

References 

Islam in Algeria
Quranic manuscripts
Warsh recitation